"Oh Na Na" is a song by Cuban-American singer Camila Cabello, Puerto Rican rapper and singer Myke Towers, and Puerto Rican record producer Tainy. The song was released on October 29, 2021, by Epic Records.

Background and composition
The song is bilingual in English and Spanish. The songwriters include Alejandro Borrero, Cabello, Towers, Tainy, Ilya Salmanzadeh, Savan Kotecha, Ivanni Rodríguez and Rickard Goransson.

Critical reception 
Billboard described "Oh Na Na" as "an effervescent, bilingual dance single, pushing Cabello to match Towers' flow and swagger, to great success; following 'Don't Go Yet,' the pop star sounds more comfortable letting loose over Tainy's frenetic drum assortment".

Charts

Release history

References

2021 singles
Camila Cabello songs
Myke Towers songs
Song recordings produced by Tainy
Songs written by Camila Cabello
Songs written by Tainy
Tainy songs